"Let Me Be Me" is the sixth and final single released from Australian singer Jessica Mauboy's debut studio album, Been Waiting. The song was written by Jade Ewen, Azi Jegbefume, Narran McLean, Karen Poole and Steve Robson, and was produced by Michael "Fingaz" Mugisha. It was released digitally and physically on 27 November 2009. "Let Me Be Me" debuted at number 33 on the ARIA Singles Chart and peaked at number 26 in its second week on the chart. The single spent nine weeks in the ARIA top fifty.

Track listing
CD single / Digital EP
"Let Me Be Me" (Radio mix) – 3:50
"Up/Down" / "Been Waiting" medley (Acoustic) – 4:52
"Let Me Be Me" (Acoustic) – 3:37

Charts

Release history

References

2009 singles
Jessica Mauboy songs
Songs written by Karen Poole
Songs written by Steve Robson
2008 songs
Sony Music Australia singles